Gordonia effusa is a bacterium from the genus Gordonia which has been isolate from human sputum in Japan.

References

External links
Type strain of Gordonia effusa at BacDive -  the Bacterial Diversity Metadatabase	

Mycobacteriales
Bacteria described in 2006